The subfamily Theclinae is a group of butterflies, often referred to as hairstreaks, with some species instead known as elfins or by other names. The group is part of the family Lycaenidae, the "gossamer-winged butterflies". There are many tropical species as well as a number found in the Americas. Tropical hairstreaks often have iridescent blue coloration above, caused by reflected light from the structure of the wing scales rather than by pigment. Hairstreaks from North America are commonly brown above. Few Theclinae are migratory. Members of this group are described as 'thecline'.

Systematics
The systematics and phylogeny of the numerous Theclinae has not reached a robust consensus yet. The arrangement presented here is based on Savela (2007), but be aware that it is probably oversplit and several tribes may not be valid. Nonetheless, the tribes as listed here generally seem to represent monophyletic lineages, but whether this is indeed so and whether these are distinct enough to warrant this level of separation remains to be resolved.

The former tribe Aphnaeini has now been given subfamily status (see Aphnaeinae).

Tribes
The subfamily includes the following tribes:

 Amblypodiini
 Arhopalini
 Catapaecilmatini
 Cheritrini
 Deudorigini
 Eumaeini
 Horagini
 Hypolycaenini
 Hypotheclini
 Iolaini
 Loxurini
 Luciini
 Oxylidini
 Remelanini
 Theclini
 Tomarini
 Zesiini

Genera of incertae sedis

The following genera have not yet been assigned to a tribe:

 Bithys
 Gigantorubra
 Macusia
 Mercedes
 Orcya
 Pamela
 Parachilades
 Pirhites
 Serratofalca
 Terra
 Thaumaina

References

 
 Savela, Markku (2007): Markku Savela's Lepidoptera and some other life forms: Theclinae. Version of 2007-APR-5. Retrieved 2007-MAY-30.

Further reading
 Glassberg, Jeffrey Butterflies through Binoculars, The West (2001)
 James, David G. and Nunnallee, David Life Histories of Cascadia Butterflies (2011)
 Pelham, Jonathan Catalogue of the Butterflies of the United States and Canada (2008)
 Pyle, Robert Michael The Butterflies of Cascadia (2002)

External links

 Atlides halesus, great purple hairstreak on the UF / IFAS Featured Creatures Web site
 Calycopis cecrops, redbanded hairstreak on the UF / IFAS Featured Creatures Web site
 Parrhasius m-album, white M hairstreak on the UF / IFAS Featured Creatures Web site
 Butterflies and Moths of North America
 Butterflies of America

 
Butterfly subfamilies
Taxa named by William John Swainson